Hamaticherus bellator is a species of beetle in the family Cerambycidae, the only species in the genus Hamaticherus.

References

Cerambycini